Sir George Russell, 4th Baronet (23 August 1828 – 7 March 1898) was a British barrister and Conservative politician who sat in the House of Commons from 1885 to 1898.

Russell was the third son of Sir Henry Russell, 2nd Baronet and his wife Marie Clotilde Mottet de la Fontaine. He was educated at Eton and Exeter College, Oxford. He was called to the bar at Lincoln's Inn in 1853 and went to the Oxford Circuit. In 1862 he became recorder of Wokingham. He was a County Court Judge of County Circuit No. 19 from 1866 to 1874, and of Circuit No. 49 from 1874 to February 1884. He succeeded his brother Charles as 4th baronet in 1883.

In the 1885 general election, Russell was elected the Conservative Member of Parliament (MP) for Wokingham. He served until his death at the age of 69 in 1898.

Russell was elected Chairman of the South Eastern Railway (SER) on 24 January 1895, and served in that post until his death on 7 March 1898, being replaced by Cosmo Bonsor. During Russell's short term as chairman, the SER began to work more closely with its rivals. The Railway Times remarked

Family
Russell married Constance Charlotte Lennox, daughter of Lord Arthur Lennox in 1871. He was succeeded in the baronetcy by his son George. They lived at Swallowfield Park in Berkshire. Their children were:
 Marie Clothilde Russell (died 1953), married Ernest, second son of Edward Guinness, 1st Earl of Iveagh 
 Sir George Arthur Charles Russell, 5th Bt. (1868–1944)
 Sir Arthur Edward Ian Montagu Russell, 6th Bt. (1878–1964)

References

Burkes Peerage (1939 edition)

External links 
 

1828 births
1898 deaths
People educated at Eton College
Alumni of Exeter College, Oxford
19th-century English judges
Baronets in the Baronetage of the United Kingdom
Conservative Party (UK) MPs for English constituencies
UK MPs 1885–1886
UK MPs 1886–1892
UK MPs 1892–1895
UK MPs 1895–1900
People from Swallowfield
English barristers
Members of Lincoln's Inn
County Court judges (England and Wales)